CSFP may refer to:

Programs
Commonwealth Scholarship and Fellowship Plan, an international programme under which Commonwealth governments offer scholarships and fellowships to citizens of other Commonwealth countries.
Commodity Supplemental Food Program, a program of the United States Department of Agriculture.

Places
City of San Fernando, Pampanga, abbreviated as CSFP, provincial capital of Pampanga, Philippines.

Other
Compact Small form-factor pluggable transceiver, a small form-factor pluggable transceiver variant